The Range is a community at University of Virginia for graduate students. The structure was designed by Thomas Jefferson as part of the original design. There are fifty-two rooms, which run parallel to the Lawn in rows. There are six "hotels" on the Range, three on each side. Originally used as dining facilities, the hotels today include a number of administrative office spaces as well as the Jefferson Literary and Debating Society. Previous Range residents who have become well-known include Edgar Allan Poe (13 W. Range) and Woodrow Wilson (31 W. Range). Pi Kappa Alpha maintains 47 W. Range, where it was founded on March 1, 1868.

References

External links 
 

University of Virginia
Buildings of the University of Virginia